OKX, formerly known as OKEx, is a Seychelles-based cryptocurrency exchange and derivatives exchange. It was founded by Star Xu (徐明星)  in 2017. OKX is owned by OK Group, which also owns crypto exchange Okcoin. It is not currently available to US-based investors. The company's CEO is Jay Hao and CMO is Haider Rafique.

OKX is a platform where investors can buy Bitcoin, Ethereum, and other cryptocurrencies. OKX is the second biggest crypto exchange by trading volume, serving over 20 million people globally.

History 
The company was launched by Star Xu in 2017 and is headquartered in Seychelles.

2018 
On April 11, 2018, the company announced its expansion to Malta, given the country's efforts to provide a sound regulatory framework for blockchain businesses and digital asset exchanges.

In May 2018, OKX became the world's largest cryptocurrency exchange by reported turnover. It has been suspected, however, that a large proportion of the reported trading volume was faked.

In June 2018, the platform became one of the largest exchanges to launch and offer a cryptocurrency exchange white label service, where applicants must have solid industry experience and $2.5 million in their accounts.

2019 
In November 2019, the Hong Kong Securities & Futures Commission (SFC) announced new digital asset exchange rules. According to Reuters, OKX said they do not expect to see many exchanges opting into the new regulations, but said the new rules are positive for the industry.

On November 19, 2019, the cryptocurrency exchange said that they previously opened their Indian Telegram group a year before opening their Indian operations.

On November 25, 2019, the company announced four major partners for its global utility token "OKB".

2021 
According to Reuters, in February 2021 OKX saw its biggest trading volume in history, up 26% from the previous month to $188 billion.

In June 2021, Baidu, Weibo and other Chinese Internet platforms blocked keywords such as "OKEx", "Binance" and "Huobi".

2022 
In January 2022, OKEx rebranded to OKX. 

In March 2022, OKX rejected calls to ban Russian crypto trading. In the same month, Manchester City F.C. announced a partnership with OKX as their official cryptocurrency partner and later in July as the training kit sponsor for the men's and women's team. 

In May 2022, OKX signed a multi-year sponsorship deal with McLaren Racing as a primary partner. In September, OKX and McLaren unveiled a cyberpunk inspired livery by enhancing the iconic Fluro Papaya colorway with flourishes of pink and cyberpunk-inspired engine illustrations for the Singapore and Japanese Grand Prixs.

Tribeca Festival signed OKX as its new top sponsor in June 2022. At Tribeca events, OKX holds exclusivity for non-fungible token (NFT) marketplaces, cryptocurrency exchanges, usage of social tokens, and De-Fi and Game Fi trading categories.

In July 2022, OKX received a provisional virtual-asset license in Dubai, which would allow OKX to provide access to some products and services to investors in the United Arab Emirates.

OKX debuted a multi-million dollar brand campaign in September 2022. The "What is OKX?" campaign featured professional soccer manager Pep Guardiola, Formula 1 driver Daniel Ricciardo and Olympic snowboarder Scotty James. The campaign’s focus was to expand awareness of OKX beyond Asia.

OKX has also partnered with McLaren Racing, Manchester City Football Club, and the Australian Olympic Team.

2023 
In January 2023, OKX released its proof of reserves report showing it has the largest clean asset reserves of all large crypto exchanges. The cleanliness of assets is a metric developed by CryptoQuant to measure the reliance of an exchange on its native token.

In February 2023, OKX, along with other exchanges, applied for licenses in Hong Kong. The licenses are a new requirement to operate in the city that go into effect in June.

Criticism and controversies
On February 24, 2018, the Dongguan Public Security Bureau officially opened a criminal case against OKX for possible "illegal futures trading" or, more seriously, "fraud".

In March 2018, some major cryptocurrency exchanges were said to be charging up to one million dollars to have their tokens listed. In response to Insider, a PR manager for OKX denied this, saying there are no listing fees for any tokens.

On March 10, 2018, Sylvain Ribes, a trader and investor, published an article titled Chasing fake volume: a crypto-plague, in which he concluded from an analysis of publicly available data that approximately 93% of trading volume on OKX was faked.

On July 30, 2018, a trader reportedly bought bitcoin futures with a $416 million notional value on margin before being forced by the exchange to liquidate his position at a large loss. The exchange injected 2,500 Bitcoins - worth about $18 million at current prices - into an insurance fund to help minimize the impact on clients. However, to cover for the outstanding amount, traders who had made an unrealized profit during the previous week still had to pay a clawback rate of 17 percent, the so-called "socialized clawback".

Initially headquartered in Beijing, China, OKX is now under a blanket ban by Chinese regulators. On October 13, 2021, it issued a "Notice on Regulatory Policy in Mainland China", announcing that it would continue its policy of "withdrawing from the Chinese mainland market" and would not establish an office or team in the region. However, according to Caixin, although the exchange officially announced that it would no longer set up an office in Mainland China, it still has a large number of R&D staff working in the region, including engineers, who continue to work for OKX in the form of third-party outsourcing companies.

OKX has experienced several downtime incidents, the most serious of which occurred on September 5, 2018, in which the exchange suddenly experienced problems such as app flashbacks, inability to log into the platform, and inability to view contracts. Subsequently, many investors crowded Beijing, where the institution was headquartered at the time, to defend their rights. On the evening of the 10th of the same month, the founder of the exchange, Star Xu, was summoned by the Shanghai public security authorities to assist in the investigation of alleged digital currency fraud.

In October 2019, Star Xu and Yongxing Yang had a dispute. Yang broke the news to the media that several of his accounts on the OKX platform had been frozen and canceled for no reason, with assets worth a combined total of about 800 million RMB vanishing into thin air, and that a case against OKX and Star Xu by him and other investors had been officially filed in the Hangzhou Internet Court.

On October 16, 2020 OKX temporarily suspended withdrawals following its founder's alleged arrest. On November 19, 2020 OKX announced that withdrawals would reopen and will resume on or before November 27.

See also
 List of cryptocurrency exchanges
 Cryptocurrency
 Blockchain
 List of Bitcoin companies

References

External links
 Official website

Bitcoin exchanges
Digital currency exchanges
Internet properties established in 2017